Marion Local High School is a public high school located in Maria Stein, Ohio. It currently has approximately 286 students enrolled. The students are from several surrounding communities, including Cassella, St. Rose, Osgood, Chickasaw, St. Sebastian, Yorkshire, and Maria Stein. These communities were served by a series of local one-room school houses that still stand in Chickasaw, St. Rose, St. Sebastian and Minster. In 1922 a 2-year high school was established in Maria Stein and in 1930 a 3-story brick school (named St. John's School) was completed directly across from St. John's Church. In 1955 the Marion Local Consolidated School District was established and charged with strengthening the educational opportunities for students in the 6 member communities. The Marion Local School District built a new high school, the Marion Local High School, in Maria Stein, Ohio in 1957.

Notability

Marion Local High School is notable statewide for its athletic prowess. Since 2000, the school has won 13 state football championships, setting a state record previously held by St Ignatius High School of Cleveland, Ohio. In addition, the school has won 9 additional state championships in various sports since 1975, placing it in the upper echelon of state athletic programs. What is equally remarkable is that this success has fostered a "can do" attitude among students leading to academic and musical success described below. Despite its small size the school is ranked academically in the upper 20% of high schools in the state.

Athletics
Marion Local is a member of the Midwest Athletic Conference. They have captured more than 50 league championships in various MAC-sanctioned sports since 1973. Marion Local has the most football state championships in the State of Ohio at 13.

Ohio High School Athletic Association State Championships 

 Boys Basketball - 1975, 2003, 2018
 Football – 2000, 2001, 2006, 2007, 2011, 2012, 2013, 2014, 2016, 2017, 2019, 2021, 2022
 Girls Basketball – 2003
 Volleyball - 2007, 2008, 2009, 2012, 2013

OHSAA State Runner-Up
 Boys Basketball - 2004
 Girls Basketball - 2000
 Football - 2003, 2015, 2018
 Girls Track and Field - 1989
 Volleyball - 2002

OHSAA State Final Four
 Boys Basketball - 1984
 Football - 1981, 1999, 2008, 2009
 Softball - 2004
 Volleyball - 2000

Ohio Music Education Association
 OMEA State Marching Band Finals participant for 34 straight years (1984 to 2017)
 28 Superior Ratings at OMEA State Marching Band Finals.  
1984-2008, 2011-2012, 2015–2017
Class C in 1984, 1985, 2011, 2012, 2015-2017
Class B in 1986, 2006-2010
Class A in 1987-1989, 2003-2005
Class AA from 1990 through 2002

The Marion Local High School Band is the largest student organization in the high school. In addition to their band activities, more than three-quarters of the members participate in a sport.

Brad Spettel is the current band director.

Notable alumni
Cory Luebke - Pitcher for the Pittsburgh Pirates and San Diego Padres.

References

External links
 School Website
 Website for Marion Local Communities

High schools in Mercer County, Ohio
Public high schools in Ohio
1922 establishments in Ohio
Educational institutions established in 1922